
Year 718 (DCCXVIII) was a common year starting on Saturday (link will display the full calendar) of the Julian calendar. The denomination 718 for this year has been used since the early medieval period, when the Anno Domini calendar era became the prevalent method in Europe for naming years.

Events 
 By place 
 Byzantine Empire 
 Spring – A Muslim supply fleet of 760 ships under Sufyan arrives from Egypt and North Africa, concealing itself along the Asiatic shore. The Byzantines learn of the fleet's location from defecting Christian Egyptian sailors. Emperor Leo III sends the Byzantine navy again; his Greek fire ships destroy the enemy vessels in the Sea of Marmara and seize their supplies on shore, denying the sieging army vital provisions. On land the Byzantine troops ambush an advancing Arab army, and destroy it in the hills around Sophon, south of Nicomedia (modern Turkey). The Arab besiegers are still suffering from hunger and pestilence.
 August 15 – Siege of Constantinople: A Bulgar relief force attacks the siege lines at Constantinople, on the west side of the Bosporus. Contemporary chroniclers report that at least 22,000–32,000 Arabs are killed during the Bulgarian attacks. Caliph Umar II is forced to lift the siege after 13 months; the Muslim army attempts to withdraw back through Anatolia, while the rest escapes by sea in the remaining vessels. The Arab fleet suffers further casualties to storms, and an eruption of the volcano of Thera. According to Arab sources 150,000 Muslims perish during the campaign.

 Western Europe 

 Battle of Soissons: King Chilperic II of Neustria and his mayor of the palace Ragenfrid, allied with Eudes, independent duke of Aquitaine, march on Soissons in Picardy (northern France). Unfortunately, an army of Frankish veterans under Charles Martel defeat the Neustrian allies, who sue for peace. Chilperic flees to the land south of the River Loire and Ragenfrid escapes to Angers. Charles diplomatically chooses not to execute the enemy leaders, and becomes undisputed dux Francorum, ending the Frankish civil war.  
 Summer – Battle of Covadonga: Pelagius (Don Pelayo) is proclaimed king (caudillo), and defeats the Umayyad forces under Munuza, provincial governor of Asturias, at Picos de Europa (near Covadonga). This marks the beginning of the Reconquista, the Christian reconquest of the Iberian Peninsula. He founds the Kingdom of Asturias, and establishes a military base at Cangas de Onís (northwest of Spain) (or 722).
 King Liutprand of the Lombards builds a close alliance with Charles Martel, and attacks the Bavarian castles on the River Adige, maintaining strategic control of the Alpine passes in the Italian Alps (approximate date).

 Britain 
 King Coenred of Northumbria dies after a 2-year reign. The throne is seized by Osric, probably a younger brother, or half-brother, of the late king Osred I.
 Former queen Cuthburh of Northumbria, abbess of Wimborne, dies at her abbey and is buried there (approximate date).

 By topic 
 Religion 
 The Wessex-born missionary Boniface sets out for Frisia a second time. He travels to Rome, where Pope Gregory II sends him on a mission to convert the Saxons in Lower Saxony (modern-day Germany).
 Hugh of Champagne, cousin of Charles Martel, enters the monastery of Jumièges (Normandy), and embraces the religious life as abbot.

Births 
 Constantine V, Byzantine emperor (d. 775)
 Kōken, empress of Japan (d. 770)
 Niall Frossach, High King of Ireland (d. 778)
 Ōtomo no Yakamochi, Japanese statesman and poet, Shōgun (d. 785)

Deaths 
 Coenred, king of Northumbria
 Cuthburh, Anglo-Saxon abbess (approximate date)
 Plectrude, Neustrian regent

References